Bicester is a historical market town, garden town, and civil parish in the Cherwell district of northeastern Oxfordshire in south-central England that also comprises an eco town at North-East Bicester and self-build village at Graven Hill. Its local market continues to thrive and is now located on Sheep Street, a very wide pedestrian zone in the conservation area of the town. Bicester is also known for Bicester Village, a nearby shopping centre selling discounted branded clothing.

Between 1951 and 2001 this historic market centre was one of the fastest-growing towns in Oxfordshire. Development has been favoured by its proximity to junction 9 of the M40 motorway linking it to London, Birmingham and Banbury.

It has its own town council. In 2014 the Government, in concert with the local planning authority, planned for Bicester to become a garden city on the basis of the size of its buffers, distance from the Metropolitan Green Belt and to accommodate the demand of commuters to London and Oxford. Up to 13,000 new homes will be built. Bicester is halfway between Birmingham and London in a straight line, being  from both cities.

Toponym
There are several theories about the origin of the name Bicester. It may be derived from a personal name Beorna and it may mean the ‘Fort of the Warriors’ or be Latin for Bi-cester, which means ‘two forts’. Bicester has been in use since the mid 17th century and derives from earlier forms including Berncestre, Burencestre, Burcester, Biciter and Bissiter; the John Speed map of 1610 shows four different spellings and historian GH Dannatt found 45 variants in wills of the 17th and 18th centuries.

History

Early history
Bicester lies close to  the junction of two Roman Roads, Akeman Street an east–west route between St Albans and Cirencester and a north–south route between Dorchester and Towcester, which lies under Queens Avenue. The  West Saxons established a settlement in the 6th century at a nodal point of these ancient routes.

St Edburg's Church in Bicester was founded as a minster, perhaps in the mid 7th century after St Birinus converted Cynegils King of the West Saxons following their meeting near Blewbury. The site was just east of the old Roman road between Dorchester and Towcester that passed through the former Roman town at Alchester. The earliest church was probably a timber structure serving the inhabitants of the growing Saxon settlements on either side of the river Bure, and as a mission centre for the surrounding countryside. Archaeological excavations at Procter's Yard identified the ecclesiastical enclosure boundary, and a large cemetery of Saxon graves suggesting a much larger churchyard has been excavated on the site of the Catholic Church car park almost opposite St. Edburg's.

The first documentary reference is the Domesday Book of 1086 which records it as Berencestra, its two manors of Bicester and Wretchwick being held by Robert D'Oyly who built Oxford Castle. The town became established as twin settlements on opposite banks of the River Bure, a tributary of the Ray, Cherwell and ultimately the River Thames.

By the end of the 13th century, Bicester was the centre of a deanery of 33 churches. The remains of an Augustinian priory founded between 1182 and 1185 survive in the town centre.
It is unclear when St Edburg's Church was rebuilt in stone, but the 12th century church seems to have had an aisleless cruciform plan. Earliest surviving material includes parts of the nave north wall including parts of an originally external zigzag string course, the north and south transepts and the external clasping buttresses of the chancel. The triangular-headed opening at the end of the north wall of the nave was probably an external door of the early church. Three great round-headed Norman arches at the end of the nave mark the position of a 13th-century tower.

The Augustinian Priory was founded by Gilbert Bassett around 1183, and endowed with land and buildings around the town and in other parishes including  and the quarry at Kirtlington,  at Wretchwick (now called),  at Stratton Audley, and on Gravenhill and Arncott. It also held the mill at Clifton and had farms let to tenants at Deddington, Grimsbury, Waddesdon and Fringford. Although these holdings were extensive and close to the market at Bicester, they appear to have been poorly managed and did not produce much income for the priory.

The priory appropriated the church in the early 13th century. The church was enlarged by a south aisle, and arches were formed in the nave and south transept walls linking the new aisle to the main body of the church.

A further extension was made in the 14th century when the north aisle was built. The arched openings in the north wall of the nave are supported on thick octagonal columns. The Perpendicular Gothic north chapel (now vestry) is of a similar date, on the east wall are two windows. The chapel originally had an upper chamber used later for the vicars' grammar school, accessed from an external staircase which forms part of the north eastern buttress.

In the 15th century, the upper walls of the nave were raised to form a clerestory with square-headed Perpendicular Gothic windows. The earlier central tower and its nave arch was taken down and the nave roof rebuilt (the present roof is a copy of 1803). The columns of the north arcade were undercut making them appear very slim and the capitals top heavy. In the east bay of the nave, there is carved decoration probably forming part of a canopied tomb originally set between the columns. The west tower was built in three stages, each stage marked by a horizontal string course running round the outside. The construction would have taken several years to complete. The battlements and crockets on the top of the tower were replaced in the mid 19th century.

The priory church was built around 1200, and enlarged around 1300 in association with the construction of the Purbeck marble tomb of St Eadburh. This may have been the gift of the priory's patron Henry de Lacy, 3rd Earl of Lincoln. The walled rectangular enclosure of the priory lay just south of the church. The gatehouse was on the site of 'Chapter and Verse' Guesthouse in Church Lane. The dovecote and houses in Old Place Yard lie within the central precinct. St Edburg's House is built partly over the site of the large priory church. This was linked by a cloister to a quadrangle containing the refectory, kitchens, dormitory and prior's lodging. The priory farm buildings lay in the area of the present church hall, and these had direct access along Piggy Lane to land in what is now the King's End estate.

Early charters promoted Bicester's development as a trading centre, with a market and fair established by the mid 13th century. By this time two further manors are mentioned, Bury End and Nuns Place, later known as Market End and King's End respectively.

Later history
The Lord of the Manor of Market End was the 1st Earl of Derby Sir Thomas Stanley, who had married Lady Margaret Beaufort, mother of Henry VII. Sir Thomas placed the crown on the head of the new King Henry VII at the Battle of Bosworth, as the step-father of Henry VII he was granted many manors. In his will of 1593, the 4th Earl of Derby, Sir Henry Stanley, bequeathed the manor to his second son Sir William Stanley of Lathom, Lancashire. Fate made William the 6th Earl of Derby in 1594 when his older brother Ferdinando, the 5th Earl, mysteriously died. In 1597, the 6th Earl sold a 9,999-year lease to 31 principal tenants. This in effect gave the manorial rights to the leaseholders, 'purchased for the benefit of those inhabitants or others who might hereafter obtain parts of the demesne'. The leaseholders elected a bailiff to receive the profits from the bailiwick, mainly from the administration of the market and distribute them to the shareholders. From the bailiff's title the arrangement became known as the Bailiwick of Bicester Market End. By 1752, all of the original leases were in the hands of ten men, who leased the bailiwick control of the market to two local tradesmen.

A fire in 1724 had destroyed the buildings on the eastern side of Water Lane. A Nonconformist congregation was able to acquire a site that had formerly been the tail of a long plot occupied at the other end by the King's Arms. Their chapel built in 1728 was 'surrounded by a burying ground and ornamented with trees. At the southern and downstream end of Water Lane, there were problems of pollution from animal dung from livery stables on the edge of town associated with the London traffic.

Edward Hemins was running a bell-foundry in Bicester by 1728 and remained in business until at least 1743. At least 19 of his church bells are known to survive, including some of those in the parishes of Ambrosden, Bletchingdon, Piddington and Wootton in Oxfordshire and Culworth in Northamptonshire.

King's End had a substantially lower population and none of the commercial bustle found on the other side of the Bure. The manorial lords, the Cokers, lived in the manor house from 1584. The house had been rebuilt in the early 18th century remodelled in the 1780s. The park was enlarged surrounded by a wall after 1753 when a range of buildings on the north side of King's End Green were demolished by Coker. A westward enlargement of the park also extinguished the road that followed the line of the Roman road. This partly overlapped a pre-1753 close belonging to Coker. The effect of the enlargement of the park was to divert traffic at the Fox Inn through King's End, across the causeway to Market Square and Sheep Street before returning to the Roman road north of Crockwell.

The two townships of King's End and Market End evolved distinct spatial characteristics. Inns, shops and high status houses clustered around the triangular market place as commercial activity was increasingly concentrated in Market End. The bailiwick lessees promoted a much less regulated market than that found in boroughs elsewhere. Away from the market, Sheep Street was considered 'very respectable' but its northern end at Crockwell was inhabited by the poorest inhabitants in low quality, subdivided and overcrowded buildings.

By 1800, the causeway had dense development forming continuous frontages on both sides. The partially buried watercourses provided a convenient drainage opportunity, and many houses had privies discharging directly into the channels. Downstream, the Bure ran parallel with Water Lane, then the main road out of town towards London. Terraces of cottages were built backing onto the brook, and here too these took advantage of the brook for sewage disposal, with privies cantilevered out from houses over the watercourse. Town houses took their water from wells dug into the substrate which became increasingly polluted by leaching of waste through the alluvial bed of the Bure.

Until the early 19th century, the road from the market place to King's End ran through a ford of the Bure brook and on to the narrow embanked road across the boggy valley. The causeway became the focus for development from the late 18th century as rubbish and debris was dumped on each side of the road to form building platforms. Minor channels of the braided stream were encased and culverted as construction proceeded.

Architecture

The vernacular buildings of the town have features of both the Cotswold dip slope to the northwest and the Thames Valley to the southeast. The earliest surviving buildings of the town are the medieval church of St Edburg; the vicarage of 1500 and two post Dissolution houses in the former Priory Precinct constructed from reused medieval material.

Early secular buildings were box framed structures, using timber from the Bernwood Forest. Infilling of frames was of stud and lath with lime render and limewash. Others were of brick or local rubble stonework. The river valleys to the south and east of the town were the source of clay for widespread local production of brick and tile. In the 18th and 19th centuries the Page-Turners had brick fields at Wretchwick and Blackthorn which operated alongside smaller producers such as farmer George Coppock who produced bricks as a sideline.

Local roofing materials included longstraw thatch, which persisted on older and lower status areas on houses and terraced cottages. Thatch had to be laid at pitches in excess of 50 degrees. This generated narrow and steep gables which also suited heavy limestone roofs made with Stonesfield slate or other roofing slabs from the Cotswolds. The other widespread roofing material was local red clay plain tiles. 19th century bulk transport innovations associated with canal and railway infrastructure allowed imports of blue slate from North Wales. These could be laid at much more shallow pitches on fashionable high status houses.

Apart from imported slate, a striking characteristic of all of the new buildings of the early 19th century is the continued use of local vernacular materials, albeit in buildings of non-vernacular design. The new buildings were constructed alongside older wholly vernacular survivals and sometimes superficially updated with fashionable applied facades, fenestration or upper floors and roofs.

Modern Bicester

Military links
The town has a long-standing connection with the military. Ward Lock & Co's 'Guide to Oxford and District' suggests that Alchester was 'a kind of Roman Aldershot'. During the Civil War (1642–49) Bicester was used as the headquarters of parliamentary forces. Following the outbreak of the French Revolutionary Wars from 1793, John Coker, the manorial lord of Bicester King's End, formed an 'Association for the Protection of Property against Levellers and Jacobins' as an anti-Painite loyalist band providing local militia and volunteer drafts for the army. When Oxford University formed a regiment in 1798, John Coker was elected Colonel.

Coker's Bicester militia had sixty privates, and six commissioned and non-commissioned officers led by Captain Henry Walford. The militia briefly stood down in 1801 after the Treaty of Amiens. But when hostilities resumed after 1804 invasion anxiety was so great as to warrant the reformation of the local militia as the Bicester Independent Company of Infantry. It had double the earlier numbers to provide defence in the event of an invasion or Jacobin insurrection. The Bicester Company was commanded by a captain, with 2 lieutenants, an ensign, 6 sergeants, 6 corporals and 120 privates. Their training and drill were such that they were deemed 'fit to join troops in the line'. The only action recorded for them is in 1806 at the 21st birthday celebrations of Sir Gregory O Page-Turner when they performed a feu de joie 'and were afterwards regaled at one of the principal inns of the town'.

During the First World War, an airfield was established north of the town for the Royal Flying Corps. This became a Royal Air Force station, but is now Bicester Airfield, the home of Windrushers Gliding Club, which was absorbed into the military gliding club previously based there, to re-emerge in 2004 when the military club left the airfield. There is now a campaign by the BCH to turn the RAF centre into a museum. They say that it is 'the best example of an historic RAF site in the UK.  The MoD's largest ordnance depot at MoD Bicester is just outside the town. The depot has its own internal railway system, the Bicester Military Railway.

Transport

Road
The town's nearest motorway is the M40 motorway, which is served by junction 9 to the south, an interchange with the A34 towards Oxford and the A41 for Bicester and Aylesbury.  Bicester has a ring road which is made up of the A41, A4095, A4421 and the newly completed Vendee Drive which forms part of the B4030.

Rail

Bicester benefited from the Railway Mania of the 1840s. Bicester's first fatal railway accident occurred at this station on 6 September 1851. Six people were killed and 18 injured. The station was renamed Bicester London Road station in March 1954 and Bicester Town station in May 1987.

The Great Western Railway sought to shorten its mainline route from London Paddington to Birmingham Snow Hill and, in 1910, opened the Bicester cut-off line through the north of the town, to complete a new fast route between the two cities and a large railway station on Buckingham Road named , which was opened on 1 July 1910. The final slip coach on the British Railways network was "slipped" at Bicester North on 10 September 1960.

The Bletchley - Oxford line was closed on 1 January 1968, but partly reopened on 11 May 1987, when a shuttle service was instituted between Bicester Town and Oxford. The line towards Bletchley remains closed. At the end of 2017, the Department for Transport announced further government funding and a private company to build and operate the line by 2025.

Bicester has also benefited from the Chiltern Evergreen 3 project, which created a new mainline allowing trains to run from London Marylebone to Oxford via Bicester. The station was completely rebuilt and, despite objection by some local residents, renamed Bicester Village, after a large retail centre nearby. The station opened in October 2015.

The London to Birmingham line was run down in the 1970s. With the threat of partial closure, stretches of the line singled and trains rerouted into London, Marylebone. Following privatisation, Chiltern Railways was awarded the franchise. It reinstated the double track and considerably boosted the number of services, resulting in a substantial increase in patronage.

Bus
Stagecoach East route X5 links Bicester with Bedford, Milton Keynes and Oxford. Stagecoach in Oxfordshire buses link Bicester with Oxford, Banbury, Brackley, Headington, HM Prison Bullingdon and some local villages. Grayline and Hallmark Connections provide some local bus services, and Langston & Tasker runs a limited service between Bicester and Buckingham. In late 2022 Diamond Bus South East, who had acquired Hallmark Connections, announced that service 250 which connected Bicester with Oxford via a number of villages would cease operating on Saturday 11th February 2023. A partial replacement will be provided by new Grayline service 24 from Monday 13th February 2023.

Air
Luton Airport is the nearest international airport,  by road, taking around 1 hour 5 minutes.

Town Council
Bicester Town Council has its offices in the Garth in Garth Park.

Residents associations
Bicester has several active residents' associations including: Bure Park Residents' Association; Langford Village Community Association; Priory Lane Residents' Association and Bicester Parkland View Residents' Association.

Schools
Bicester has four secondary schools: The Bicester School, the Cooper School, whitelands academy and Bicester Tech Studio. There are a number of primary schools including: Langford Village Primary; Glory Farm Primary School; Southwold; Brookside Primary School; St Edburg's; Five Acres; Longfields; St Mary's Primary School; King's Meadow and Bure Park Primary.  The new Kingsmere development (south of Bicester) is due to create a two-form primary school and a secondary school(whitelands academy).

Sport and leisure
Bicester and North Oxford Cricket Club play at Akeman Street, Chesterton. It was formed in 1996 from a merger of Bicester Town, (founded in 1871) and the North Oxford Cricket Clubs which until 1929 shared the Oxford Road ground with the town's football club. As of 2014 season, the senior teams play in the Cherwell League. Bicester Rugby Club was founded in 1947, originally playing on land provided by the King's Head pub. The club is presently based at the Akeman Street Ground. The senior teams play in the Berks/Bucks & Oxon Premier

Bicester Town Football Club was founded in 1896 and until the 2010–11 season played in the Hellenic League. Bicester Colts F.C. organises teams from ages 5 through to 17 at facilities based at Akeman Street, Chesterton.  Bicester Blue Fins Amateur Swimming Club was established in 1950 and has been based at Bicester Leisure Centre since 1971. Bicester Blue Fins is 'SWIM 21' accredited and affiliated to the Oxfordshire & North Buckinghamshire ASA and the ASA South East Region.

The Bicester Leisure Centre, which opened in 1970, comprises swimming pool, fitness, gym facilities and all-weather pitches. Other popular sports and pastimes include tennis, which is played at the Bicester Tennis Club based at the Garth. It is affiliated to the Oxfordshire and Thames Valleys LTAs. Lawn bowls is organised by the Bicester Bowls Club which was founded in 1862 and since 1951 has been at the Garth. There are two 18-hole golf courses, at the Bicester Hotel and Bicester Country Club. The traditional game of Aunt Sally, widespread in Oxfordshire, is popular in the town and is organised under the auspices of the Bicester and District Aunt Sally League.

Bicester Town Council provides a wide range of sport and leisure facilities for local residents and sports team on sites at Pingle Field and Sunderland Drive

Shopping

The historic shopping streets, particularly Sheep Street and Market Square, have a range of local and national shops together with cafés, pubs and restaurants. Sheep Street is now pedestrianised, with car parks nearby. There are weekly markets on Fridays in the town centre along with farmers' markets and an occasional French market.

A £70 million redevelopment of the town centre, originally planned to start in 2008, was delayed by the onset of the credit crunch; Sainsbury's pledged to develop the project itself in January 2009. The development, since named Pioneer Square, is now complete and opened on 9 July 2013, offering a Sainsbury's supermarket, 7 screen Vue Cinemas and many smaller retail units and restaurants such as Nando's and Prezzo. There are further plans to construct a new civic centre adjacent to the new buildings, as well as talk of improving the Market Square at a later date.

South of Bicester, beyond Pingle Field, is designer outlet centre Bicester Village Shopping Centre, and beyond that is Bicester Avenue Home & Garden Centre, one of the largest garden centres in the UK.

Churches

Most churches in Bicester belong to the ecumenical organisation Churches Together: Crowded House (Pioneers in missional Community, meeting in the Moto); St Edburg's Parish Church (Church of England); Emmanuel Church (Church of England, meeting in their new (December 2012) church at Barberry Place); Bicester Community Church (meeting in the Salvation Army Hall); Bicester Methodist Church; The Church of the Immaculate Conception (Roman Catholic); Elim Lighthouse Church (Pentecostal – meeting in Bicester Methodist Church); Orchard Baptist Church (meeting in Cooper School); and the Salvation Army.  Churches independent of Churches Together are: Bicester Baptist Church (meeting in Southwold Community Centre); and Hebron Gospel Hall.

Future development
Bicester is in the midst of several construction projects the most recent of these completed being the new Tesco superstore which replaces the former site in Pingle Drive. The 5,181 sq metre Pingle Drive site shall be used to expand the Bicester village outlet centre by an additional quarter in size.

On 1 December 2014, it was announced that Bicester had been chosen as the site for the British government's second new garden city. Up to 13,000 new homes could be built in the town, as part of plans to help deal with the UK's housing shortage. The town got a new railway station, Bicester Village Station, to serve the expanded population as part of rail plans previously detailed by Deputy Prime Minister Nick Clegg. The station will also serve the planned East West Rail Project, connecting Oxford to Cambridge, via Milton Keynes and Bedford. 

Since the garden city announcement, work has begun on the 6,000 home Eco-Town development to the northwest of Bicester,1,585 homes in phase 1 and 709 homes in phase 2 in the south-westerly development named Kingsmere and 1,900 homes in the south-easterly Graven Hill with a selection of self-build plots as focused on in the TV Show Grand Designs: The Street.  The first residents moved into the Eco-Town development in May 2016, in the newly named Elmsbrook area.

Geography

Areas and suburbs
There are 5 electoral wards, North, East, South, West and Town as defined by the town council. The areas of Bicester include:

Climate
Bicester experiences an oceanic climate (Köppen climate classification Cfb) similar to almost all of the United Kingdom.

Twin towns 

  Neunkirchen-Seelscheid

Notable residents and natives
 Albert Freeman Africanus King, (born in a hospital) doctor who took care of Abraham Lincoln when he was shot
 John Dunkin (1782–1846) topographer and local historian, who wrote comprehensive history of Bicester and the surrounding villages – The History and Antiquities of Bicester and The History and Antiquities of the Hundreds of Bullingdon and Ploughley
 Tim Harvey, racing driver and TV-commentator.
 Jenson Button, racing driver
 Isla St Clair, singer and broadcaster
 Andy Gomarsall MBE, played Rugby Union for Bicester until 1993 and for England.
 Ian Paice, drummer with rock group Deep Purple. Brought up in King's End.
 Professor Alun Howkins, born and brought up in the town. Professor of history at Sussex University. Wrote and presented the BBC TV series Fruitful Earth. 
 Sam Long, professional footballer for Oxford United.

Arms

References

Notes

Sources and further reading

External links

 Bicester Town Council

 
Civil parishes in Oxfordshire
Market towns in Oxfordshire